Tazehabad (also Romanized as Tāzehābād; also known as Tāzehābād-e Pīr Tāj and Tāzehābād-e Qarālchūq) is a village in Khvor Khvoreh Rural District, in the Central District of Bijar County, Kurdistan Province, Iran. At the 2006 census, its population was 158, in 29 families. The village is populated by Azerbaijanis.

References 

Towns and villages in Bijar County
Azerbaijani settlements in Kurdistan Province